Steeple is a village on the Dengie Peninsula in Essex, England. It is situated just east of Maylandsea and Mayland, on the southern side of the River Blackwater estuary.

A hamlet, within the village of Steeple, on the banks of the River Blackwater is called Stansgate.

Steeple Church
The current church was built in the centre of the village  re-using some materials from the old church.

On the west side of the village, there is a former chapel building of the Peculiar People, built in 1877.

Stansgate Priory
Stansgate Priory was a Cluniac Priory built near to the banks of the River Blackwater in about 1120. It was one of many priories closed by Thomas Cromwell in 1534.

Viscounts Stansgate
The village has been home to several generations of the Benn family, who were created Viscounts Stansgate in 1942, since about 1900. They live in Stansgate House.

References

Villages in Essex
Maldon District